Shahrak-e Ghadir (also Romanized as Shahrak-e Ghadīr) is a village in Siyakh Darengun Rural District, in the Central District of Shiraz County, Fars Province, Iran. At the 2006 census, its population was 1,016, in 210 families.

References 

Populated places in Shiraz County